Cyanotis somaliensis, pussy ears, is a species of flowering plant in the family Commelinaceae, described in 1895. It is endemic to Somaliland in East Africa.

This plant is valued for its ornamental properties. In temperate regions it must be grown under glass, as it does not tolerate temperatures below . It has gained the Royal Horticultural Society's Award of Garden Merit.
It prefers rather dry conditions in bright light.

References

somaliensis
Flora of Somalia
Plants described in 1895